Oskar Wagner (19 January 1901 – 8 September 1972) was an Austrian composer, who worked on twenty film scores including It's Only Love, portraying the life of Franz Schubert.

Selected filmography
 The Endless Road (1943)
 I Need You (1944)
 It's Only Love (1947)
 A Heart Beats for You (1949)

References

Bibliography 
 Fritsche, Maria. Homemade Men in Postwar Austrian Cinema: Nationhood, Genre and Masculinity. Berghahn Books, 2013.

External links 
 

1901 births
1972 deaths
Austrian composers
Austrian male composers
Musicians from Vienna
20th-century Austrian composers
20th-century Austrian male musicians